Ioannis Thomaidis (Greek: Ιωάννης Θωμαΐδης; born 29 February 1972) is a Greek Opponent Analysis of PAOK FC. He was born in Florina, Greece. He has also followed seminars on video analysis and has also earned the coaching diplomas of UEFA, making it to the UEFA Pro.

References

External links
 at paokfc.gr

1972 births
Living people
Greek footballers
Eordaikos 2007 F.C. players
Panathinaikos F.C. players
Doxa Drama F.C. players
OFI Crete F.C. players
Apollon Smyrnis F.C. players
Veria F.C. players
Ethnikos Asteras F.C. players
Paniliakos F.C. players
Anagennisi Arta F.C. players
Kastoria F.C. players
Makedonikos F.C. players
Aetos Skydra F.C. players
Super League Greece players
Association football forwards
Platanias F.C. managers
PAOK FC non-playing staff
Greek football managers
Footballers from Florina